Laze is a small settlement in the eastern Gorjanci Hills in the Municipality of Brežice in eastern Slovenia. The area is part of the traditional region of Lower Carniola. It is now included in the Lower Sava Statistical Region.

References

External links
Laze on Geopedia

Populated places in the Municipality of Brežice